The 1884 Paisley by-election was a parliamentary by-election held on 15 February 1884 for the British House of Commons constituency of Paisley in Scotland. It was caused by the resignation of the constituency's sitting Liberal Member of Parliament William Holms who had held the seat since the general election of 1880 when he was returned unopposed.

Result

The seat was held for the Liberals by Stewart Clark, a local thread manufacturer.

References

1884 in Scotland
1880s elections in Scotland
1884 elections in the United Kingdom
Politics of Paisley, Renfrewshire
History of Renfrewshire
By-elections to the Parliament of the United Kingdom in Scottish constituencies